Paranagia is a monotypic moth genus in the family Erebidae erected by George Hampson in 1926. Its only species, Paranagia rufostrigata, was first described by George Thomas Bethune-Baker in 1906. It is found on New Guinea and on the southern Maluku Islands, Sulawesi and Borneo. The habitat consists of forests and areas with secondary vegetation.

Adults have a very variable forewing pattern. The hindwings are white with a broad black border.

References

Monotypic moth genera
Catephiini
Moths described in 1906
Moths of Indonesia
Moths of New Guinea